Min Chen may refer to:
 Min Chen (biologist), biologist at the University of Sydney
 Min Chen (computer scientist) (born 1980), professor at Huazhong University of Science and Technology
 Min Chen (murderer) (born 1983), Chinese visa student convicted of second-degree murder in the case of the death of Cecilia Zhang